Meadville is a town in and the county seat of Franklin County, Mississippi, United States, in the southwest part of the state. The population was 449 at the 2010 census, down from 519 at the 2000 census. It is situated north of the Homochitto River, which runs from the northeast to the southwest through the county on its way to its outlet at the Mississippi River.

It is home of a chess center, covered in 60 Minutes story aired March 26, 2017, involving chess coach Jeff Bulington.

History
The town was named after Cowles Mead, a 19th-century political leader. This town developed as a trading center for the agricultural county, which had an early economy based on the cultivation of cotton. Court days also attracted farmers and their customers. The county is still largely rural.

Geography
Meadville is located in the center of Franklin County at  (31.472998, -90.890856). U.S. Routes 98 and 84 bypass the town to the south. US 84 leads east  to Brookhaven, and US 98 leads southeast  to McComb. Together the highways lead west  to Natchez.

Demographics
The town had its peak of population in 1960. As of the 2020 United States census, there were 448 people, 230 households, and 144 families residing in the town.

Race and ethnicity

In 2000, the racial makeup of the town was 82.85% White, 15.41% African American, 0.77% Asian, and 0.96% from two or more races. Hispanic or Latino of any race were 0.58% of the population. By 2020, its racial and ethnic makeup was 80.13% non-Hispanic white, 15.63% African American, 0.45% Native American, 3.13% mixed, and 0.67% Hispanic or Latino of any race.

Education
Meadville is served by the Franklin County School District, which includes Franklin County Elementary and a host of day cares and headstarts.

Notable people
 Greg Briggs, former NFL safety
 Leonard Caston, blues pianist and guitarist
 Charles Marcus Edwards, confessed murderer and member of the Ku Klux Klan
 Dick Jones, former Major League Baseball pitcher
 Pat McGehee, former Major League Baseball pitcher
 Carl Weathersby, electric blues guitarist, vocalist, and songwriter
 Pete Young, former Major League Baseball pitcher

References

External links
 Town of Meadville official website

Towns in Franklin County, Mississippi
Towns in Mississippi
County seats in Mississippi